Bird in the Wire is a 2001 Australian comedy short film directed by Phillip Donnellon and starring Christine Wilson, Kate Jane Norris, and Valerie Bean.

Bird in the Wire was shown at film festivals in over twenty countries, including the Atlantic Film Festival, the Cannes Film Festival and the Cleveland International Film Festival.

Premise 
The film involves three women on a coat-hanger production line. After one sees a bird, she is inspired to make a coathanger in the shape of a bird in flight.

Cast 
Kate Jane Norris as Woman 1
Christine Wilson as Woman 2
Valerie Bean as Woman 3

Accolades 
Nominated for Best Cinematography in a Non-Feature Film at the 43rd Australian Film Institute Awards in 2001
Nominated for Palme d'Or - Best Short Film at the 54th Cannes Film Festival in 2001

References

External links
 
 Bird in the Wire on Vimeo

Australian comedy short films
2001 films
2001 short films
2001 comedy films
2000s Australian films